Inés of My Soul (Spanish: Inés del alma mía) is a 2020 historical drama streaming television series produced by RTVE, and Chilevisión based on the historical novel of the same name by Isabel Allende. The filming of the series began on 2 September 2019, and concluded in December 2019. A total of 8 episodes were confirmed for the series, which premiered on 31 July 2020 on Amazon Prime Video, solely in Spain. The episodes aired weekly on La 1 from 7 October 2020 to 25 November 2020. The episodes aired on Chilevisión from 14 September 2021 to 17 September 2021.

Cast 
 Elena Rivera as Inés Suárez
 Eduardo Noriega as Pedro de Valdivia
 Benjamín Vicuña as Rodrigo de Quiroga
 Carlos Bardem as Diego de Almagro
 Enrique Arce as Sancho de la Hoz
 Francesc Orella as Francisco Pizarro
  as Juan de Málaga
 Daniela Ramírez as Marina Ortiz de Gaete
  as Hernando Pizarro
  as Francisco de Aguirre
  as María Asunción Suárez, Inés' sister
 Antonia Giesen as Cecilia, Inca princess
 Pedro Fontaine as Juan Gómez
 Rafael de la Reguera as 
 Nicolás Zárate as Alderete
  as Michimalonco
 Elvis Fuentes as Marmolejo
 Patricia Cuyul as Catalina, Inés' maid in South America
 Francisco Ossa as Don Benito
 Juan Fernández as Don Alonso.

Episodes

Production 
Shooting locations included sites in Spain (La Calahorra, Cáceres, Trujillo), Peru (Ollantaytambo,  Chinchero, Pisak) and Chile (Santiago, the Atacama Desert, the Araucania and Valdivia).

Awards and nominations 

|-
| align = "center" rowspan = "2" | 2021 || 8th  || colspan = 2 | Best Miniseries ||  || align = "center" | 
|-
| 23rd  || colspan = "2" | Audience Award for the Spanish selection ||  || 
|}

References 

2020s drama television series
2020s Chilean television series
2020 Chilean television series debuts
2020s Spanish drama television series
2020 Spanish television series debuts
2020 Spanish television series endings
Chilean drama television series
Spanish-language television shows
Works about Chile
Television series about the history of Spain
Television series set in the 16th century
Chilevisión original programming
RTVE shows
Spanish-language Amazon Prime Video original programming
Television series based on novels
Television shows filmed in Spain
Television shows filmed in Chile
Television shows filmed in Peru
Television series by Boomerang TV